Cameroon first participated at the Olympic Games in 1964, and has sent athletes to compete in every Summer Olympic Games since then.  The nation withdrew from the 1976 Summer Olympics after three days of competition, to join the broad African boycott in response to the participation of New Zealand, who still had sporting links with apartheid South Africa. Cameroon has also participated in the Winter Olympic Games on one occasion, in 2002, with a single representative, Isaac Menyoli.

Cameroonian athletes have won a total of six medals, including the gold medal in football at the 2000 Summer Olympics.

The Cameroon Olympic and Sports Committee was created and recognized by the IOC in 1963.

Medal tables

Medals by Summer Games

Medals by Winter Games

Medals by sport

List of medalists

See also
 List of flag bearers for Cameroon at the Olympics
 :Category:Olympic competitors for Cameroon
 Tropical nations at the Winter Olympics

External links